Senator Woodward may refer to:

Asa Woodward (1830–1921), Connecticut State Senate
Benjamin Woodward (New York politician) (1780–1841), New York State Senate
Elbert A. Woodward (1836–1905), Connecticut State Senate
Rob Woodward (politician) (fl. 2010s), Colorado State Senate

See also
Senator Woodard (disambiguation)